The Ystradyfodwg School Board, covering the rapidly growing Rhondda Valleys was formed in 1878 and consisted of thirteen members elected for a period of three years. It was abolished, along with other School Boards in 1902 and its responsibilities transferred to Glamorgan County Council.

In the main, the members were local industrialists, tradesmen, nonconformist ministers and, in later years, a smattering of working men. A number of prominent figures in the public life of the Rhondda served their apprenticeship on the Board.

The 1878 School Board Election

The initial Board included William Abraham (Mabon), the future MP for the Rhondda.

The 1881 School Board Election
The second election took place in 1881. "On the whole, commented a local newspaper, "we think this may be taken to be a fair representative Board."

The 1884 School Board Election
The third election took place in 1884.

The 1887 School Board Election
Following the success of William Abraham (Mabon) at the 1885 General Election the School Board election was contested by Labour candidates.

The 1890 School Board Election
The fifth election was held in October 1890.

The 1893 School Board Election
The sixth election was held in October 1893.

References

History of education in Wales
School boards in the United Kingdom